The Umkhonto Field Engineer Regiment (formerly 19 Field Engineer Regiment) is a regiment of the South African Army Engineer Formation. The unit is based in Durban with the HQ being at Old Fort Military Base, Lord's Grounds . As a reserve unit, it has a status roughly equivalent to that of a British Army Reserve or United States Army National Guard unit.

The role of the Engineers is to maintain mobility and serviceability of own forces and counter mobility of
enemy forces. Tasks include bridging, water purification, obstacles, demolition, infrastructure repair and
development.

History

Origin
19 Field Engineer Regiment was established as a Squadron in 1970 directly under Natal Command and was the first Engineer Squadron to be formed in Durban since the Second World War.

Border War
The squadron and later the Regiment was called up for a number of border duty camps during the 1970s and 1980s.

Post 1994
During the 1994 election, the unit was called up and deployed in the Eshowe area under command of the Durban Light Infantry.

In 1995 and 1996 the unit participated in training camps in Lohatla.

With the formation of the 'type' formations, including the South African Army Engineer Formation (SAAEF), in 1999, the regiment shifted from the territorial command structure to that of the SAAEF.

During 2000 to 2005 a new strategy was put in place and for the first time the unit started to train its own recruited members in Basic Engineer Corps training and Junior Leader training.

One of the highlights during this time was the construction of a permanent 8 bay Single-Double Bailey bridge in the Manguzi area, near the Mozambique border to improve local security.

By 2006 the unit mandate changed. The first detachments of unit members were deployed to the Democratic Republic of Congo (DRC), as part of the United Nations (MONUC) and AU Peace Support operations. Up until October 2014, the Regiment has undertaken six deployments to the DRC.

The Regiment supplied one member to be part of the United Nations Force Intervention Brigade. Lt John Dovey  deployed in the post of Combat Demolitions Team Leader as part of the Engineer troop attached to the 6 SAI Battalion.

The motto of the Engineer Corps is “Ubique” which means, Everywhere.
The motto of the Regiment is First in, Last out.

Insignia 
The unit's insignia is based in the Roman numerals XIX (19) from its name.

Leadership

References

External links 
 
 

Engineer regiments of South Africa
Military units and formations in Durban
Military units and formations established in 1970